Kerem Bülbül (born 12 January 1995) is a German professional footballer who plays as an attacking midfielder.

References

External links
 
 

Living people
1995 births
German people of Turkish descent
German footballers
Footballers from Berlin
Association football midfielders
Germany youth international footballers
Sivasspor footballers
Hertha BSC II players
FC Ingolstadt 04 players
FC Hansa Rostock players
1. FSV Mainz 05 II players
Berliner AK 07 players
Tennis Borussia Berlin players
Regionalliga players
3. Liga players
German expatriate footballers
German expatriate sportspeople in Turkey
Expatriate footballers in Turkey